Reverse graffiti is a method of creating temporary or semi-permanent images on walls or other surfaces by removing dirt from a surface. It can also be done by simply removing dirt with the fingertip from windows or other dirty surfaces, such as writing "wash me" on a dirty vehicle. Others, such as graffiti artist Moose, use a cloth or a high-power washer to remove dirt on a larger scale.

Reverse graffiti has been used as a form of advertising, although this usage has been controversial, as its legality varies depending on jurisdiction.

Origin

English artist Paul Curtis (aka Moose) is one of the first street artists to make an art piece using the reverse graffiti technique. Moose discovered the technique while washing dishes at his restaurant job; he attempted to wipe a mark from the wall only to discover that the wall was actually white and the brown stain was from nicotine smoke. From there, Paul 'Moose' Curtis began his career in the music industry eventually going on to manage a record label. The technique gained traction once Moose began promoting an album for his record label in Leeds, England.  

Moose ran into some legal trouble with the British Council, who couldn't decide if reverse graffiti was actually illegal. However, this run in with the law only allowed the medium to reach a bigger platform. 

Regarding reverse graffiti,  Paul 'Moose' Curtis had said: “I felt like I created this really curious process that flipped the laws and made it really awkward for the legal system to deal with... it was just in a beautiful gray area..."

The first large-scale reverse graffiti art piece was made by Alexandre Orion in 2006. The intervention was called Ossario (ossuary) and was over 1000 feet long. The municipality of São Paulo washed it away on July 26.

Environmental effects 
Reverse graffiti is a subtractive process, most often 'cleaning' dirt and pollution from public areas to leave behind messages and/or art pieces. The process has also been linked to the term 'reverse-pollution' literally describes the process of undoing or cleaning pollution caused by human interaction.  

Artists like Moose and Jim Bowes of GreenGraffiti make sure to keep sustainability at the forefront of their work.

It is estimated that one 55-inch square requires 4-5 gallons of water to create an impression; this is around thirty times less than is needed to produce a paper poster of comparable size. GreenGraffiti also adopted a program where they match every liter used in reverse graffiti with a liter of clean drinking water to a drought-stricken region.

Process 
There are a few different ways to approach reverse graffiti. 

It most often starts with a stencil created by the artist. Stencils are made of plastic, steel, aluminum, and/or wood. Stencil designs can be laser cut or cut by hand.

Artists use power washers, rags, and even toothbrushes. Power washers are the most common technique used among commissioned artists as they are the fastest and most efficient choice to cover large areas. Rags and small brushes can be used to wipe away dust (often on cars or windows) or other lightly dirty surfaces. In some videos, artists can be seen using toothbrushes and concrete cleaner to scrub out smaller messages or pictures.

Commercial
As with traditional graffiti, the technique is also used commercially as a form of out-of-home advertising. In this context, marketers call it "clean advertising" or "clean graffiti".

Reverse graffiti has been described by promoters as an environmentally friendly form of advertising, since  it is temporary, and can sometimes be done with innocuous or biodegradable materials.

GreenGraffiti, founded by Jim Bowes, is one of the first firms to employ for the purposes of using reverse graffiti for publicity. Bowes' company now has licensing agreements in more than 10 countries. Domino's Pizza was one of the earliest companies to commission GreenGraffiti; the company invested $20,000 and they reported an estimated $1 million worth of publicity gained.

Companies such as Microsoft, Channel 4 and Smirnoff have advertised their products in this way. In response to Moose's use of the technique for advertising in Leeds, a city council representative described the work as "illegal advertising". Leeds council later attempted a 12-month trial program allowing clean advertising in exchange for a percentage of fees. The program was criticised by local officials. In 2011, a Swindon, UK advertising firm was fined by the city's council for a reverse graffiti campaign.

In the Netherlands one needs to have a permit for commercial advertisements in a public space even if nothing is being destroyed.

In Hungary under the name "inverz graffiti" companies and brands like The Coca-Cola Company with "It's Rite" for Sprite, Monster, Deutsche Telekom's local arm Magyar Telekom, Manpower, Ringier  publishing house for launching its Népsport blogging platform, TUC advertised with this tool.

Note

See also

 Glossary of graffiti
 List of street artists

References 

Graffiti and unauthorised signage